Robert Žák (born 6 May 1966) is a Czech football manager and former player.

As a player, he played in the Czechoslovak First League until its conclusion in 1993, after which he continued in the Gambrinus liga for one season before finishing his professional playing career in 1994.

He has managed three clubs in the Gambrinus liga, firstly České Budějovice followed by Most and most recently Bohemians Prague.

Playing career
As a player, Žák played as a midfielder. He played a total of 111 matches and scored 18 goals in the Czechoslovak First League, representing Slavia Prague, Hradec Králové and České Budějovice before the league's discontinuation in 1993. After the formation of the Gambrinus liga in 1993, Zak went on to play one more league season, playing 27 matches and scoring 4 goals for České Budějovice.

Management career
Žák's first position as a football manager commenced in October 2004, when he was announced as the replacement for Pavel Tobiáš at Gambrinus liga side České Budějovice. He signed a two-year contract with the club, although due to a run of seven consecutive defeats which left the club last in the table, he was replaced by František Cipro in March 2005.

Žák was appointed manager at Most in the summer of 2007, replacing outgoing manager Zdeněk Ščasný. He had previously worked with the youth teams at the club. Most finished the 2007–08 season in last place and were relegated to the Czech 2. Liga, although Žák refused to resign despite pressure from fans to do so. He was finally relieved of his duties at Most three matches before the end of the 2008–09 season.

Žák was appointed as manager of Bohemians Prague, replacing Luboš Urban before the start of the 2009–10 Gambrinus liga. Despite his recent appointment, Žák was the first league manager of the season to lose his job in August 2009, with the club failing to score any points in their opening four league matches.

Žák took over at Litvínov of the Czech Fourth Division in the summer of 2010. His spell in charge lasted just a short time as he was sacked in September 2010 following a run of four matches without scoring a point.

References

External links
 Profile at iDNES.cz 

1966 births
Living people
People from Strakonice
Czech footballers
Czechoslovak footballers
Czech First League players
SK Slavia Prague players
FC Hradec Králové players
SK Dynamo České Budějovice players
Czech football managers
Czech First League managers
SK Dynamo České Budějovice managers
FK Baník Most managers
FK Bohemians Prague (Střížkov) managers
Association football midfielders
Sportspeople from the South Bohemian Region